Marko Reikop (born 19 June 1969 in Tallinn) is an Estonian TV host.

He graduated from the Tallinn University on bibliography and is employed by radio and TV channels of the Estonian Public Broadcasting since 1991.

He has presented the Estonian national finals for Eurovision Song Contest and made a live commentary for the event. From 2009 and on, he presents the daily talk show Ringvaade together with Anu Välba (along with Grete Lõbu since autumn of 2013).

In 2018, he was given Fifth Class of the Order of the White Star by the President of Estonia.

Reikop is openly gay. In September 2020, Reikop was the subject, along with Ringvaade cohost Grete Lõbu, of an anti-gay slur by Conservative People's Party of Estonia (EKRE) MP and Eesti Rahvusringhääling (ERR) board representative Urmas Reitelmann in a social media post, which caused a backlash by ERR supervisory board member Rein Veidemann and ERR board chair Erik Roose, with Veidemann calling for Reitelmann's removal from the board. Reikop later stated that he considered filing a court action suit against Reitelmann.

References

1969 births
Living people
Estonian journalists
People from Tallinn
Estonian television presenters
Estonian television personalities
Estonian radio personalities
Estonia in the Eurovision Song Contest
Tallinn University alumni
Recipients of the Order of the White Star, 5th Class
Estonian LGBT people
Eurovision commentators
20th-century Estonian people